Michael Lewis (born 1960) is an American non-fiction author and financial journalist.

Michael Lewis may also refer to:

Sports

American football
 Michael Lewis (safety) (born 1980), American football strong safety
 Michael Lewis (wide receiver) (born 1971), American football wide receiver and punt returner
 Mike Lewis (American football) (born 1949), American football defensive lineman
 Mike Lewis (arena football) (born 1984), arena football player

Other sports
 Michael Lewis (cyclist) (born 1967), Belizean racing cyclist
 Michael James Lewis (born 1990), American racing driver
 Michael Lewis (basketball coach) (born 1977), American Basketball coach
 Mick Lewis (born 1974), Australian cricketer
 Mickey Lewis (1965-2021), English footballer
 Mike Lewis (basketball) (born 1946), American basketball player
 Mike Lewis (rower) (born 1981), Canadian rower

Others
 Michael Lewis (archaeologist), British archaeologist
 Michael Lewis (bishop) (born 1952), bishop of the Anglican Diocese of Cyprus and the Gulf
 Michael Lewis (businessman) (born 1959), South African-born British businessman
 Michael Lewis (model) (born 1987), Israeli basketball player, actor and fashion model
 Michael Lewis (MP), one term (1571–1572), representing Parliament of England predecessor of Stamford (UK Parliament constituency)
 Michael Lewis (musician), American saxophonist 
 Michael Lewis (naval historian) (1890–1970), British naval historian
 Michael Lewis (philosopher) (born 1977), British philosopher
 Michael Lewis (psychologist) (born 1937), American developmental psychologist
 Michael J. Lewis (composer) (born 1939), British composer of film music
 Michael J. Lewis (architecture critic), American architecture critic
 Michael V. Lewis (born 1963), American CEO and businessman
 Mike Lewis (model) (born 1981), Japan-born, Indonesian model
 Mike Lewis (musician) (born 1977), rhythm guitarist of Welsh alternative rock band, Lostprophets